Muhammad Hanif Malik Awan is a Pakistani politician who had been a Member of the Provincial Assembly of the Punjab, from 1997 to 1999 and again from June 2013 to May 2018. He had been a member of the National Assembly of Pakistan from December 2012 to March 2013.

Early life and education
He was born on 5 May 1952 in Gujrat.

He has received matriculation level education.

Political career
He ran for the seat of the Provincial Assembly of the Punjab as an independent candidate from Constituency PP-95 (Gujrat-cum-Jhelum) in 1993 Pakistani general election but was unsuccessful. He received 20,726 votes and lost the seat to a candidate of Pakistan Muslim League (J) (PML-J).

He was elected to the Provincial Assembly of the Punjab as a candidate of Pakistan Muslim League (N) (PML-N) from Constituency PP-95 (Gujrat-cum-Jhelum) in 1997 Pakistani general election. He received 29,854 votes and defeated a candidate of PML-J.

He could not contest the 2002 general election due to graduation degree requirement.

He was elected to the National Assembly of Pakistan from Constituency NA-107 (Gujrat-IV) as a candidate of PML-N in by-polls held in 2012. He received 70,434 votes and defeated Rehman Naseer, a candidate of Pakistan Muslim League (Q) (PML-Q).

He was re-elected to the Provincial Assembly of the Punjab as a candidate of PML-N from Constituency PP-114 (Gujrat-VII) in 2013 Pakistani general election. He received 40,428 votes and defeated Raja Muhammad Naeem Nawaz, a candidate of Pakistan Tehreek-e-Insaf (PTI).

References

Living people
Pakistani MNAs 2008–2013
Punjab MPAs 2013–2018
1952 births
Punjab MPAs 1997–1999
Pakistan Muslim League (N) politicians